Ian Watkin (25 January 1940 – 18 May 2016) was a New Zealand actor known for the films Braindead and Sleeping Dogs. Watkin grew up in Greymouth, and started his career in theatre and radio plays, and working as a magazine editor before emigrating to Australia in 1999  where he continued to appear in numerous television and theatre roles and also became a wine broker. He was also known as Mr. Big Cheese due to a television commercial in which he appeared.

After having appeared in Pukemanu, he featured in an episode of Ngaio Marsh Theatre in 1977. His later roles included Star Wars: Episode II - Attack of the Clones and Charlotte's Web in 2006.

Death
Ian Watkin died of cancer on 18 May 2016, aged 76.

Selected filmography
Sleeping Dogs (1977) - Dudley
Wild Man (1977) - The Colonel
Middle Age Spread (1979) - Wrightson
A Woman of Good Character (1980) -  Stock Buyer
Goodbye Pork Pie (1980) - Father in Car
Nutcase (1980) - Godzilla
Bad Blood (1981) - Detective Sgt. Knight
Beyond Reasonable Doubt (1982) - Kevin Ryan
Carry Me Back (1982) - M.C.
The Lost Tribe (1983) - Mears
Utu (1984) - Doorman
Death Warmed Up (1984) - Bill
Pallet on the Floor (1984) - Amos
Send a Gorilla (1988)
Just Me and Mario (1988)
My Grandpa Is a Vampire (1992) - Father Vincent
Braindead (1992) - Uncle Les
Savage Honeymoon (2000) - Frank
Star Wars: Episode II – Attack of the Clones (2002) - COO-2180 (uncredited)
Charlotte's Web (2006) - Fair Official (final film role)

References

External links

1940 births
2016 deaths
New Zealand male film actors
New Zealand male stage actors
New Zealand male television actors
People from Greymouth
People educated at Greymouth High School